Bendering is a town located between Kondinin
and Narembeen in the eastern Wheatbelt region of Western Australia.

The town was gazetted in 1921. The name of the town is taken from a nearby spring and is Aboriginal in origin; its meaning is unknown.

The surrounding areas produce wheat and other cereal crops. The town is a receival site for Cooperative Bulk Handling.

References 

Towns in Western Australia
Grain receival points of Western Australia
Shire of Kondinin